The list of shipwrecks in 1961 includes ships sunk, foundered, grounded, or otherwise lost during 1961.

January

1 January

3 January

5 January

9 January

10 January

11 January

12 January

18 January

20 January

21 January

25 January

26 January

Unknown date

February

3 February

5 February

8 February

17 February

19 February

20 February

26 February

Unknown date

March

1 March

11 March

16 March

17 March

19 March

21 March

22 March

April

3 April

6 April

8 April

14 April

16 April

17 April

19 April

25 April

Unknown date

May

3 May

7 May

25 May

28 May

31 May

June

1 June

6 June

8 June

14 June

18 June

25 June

26 June

Unknown date

July

1 July

2 July

4 July

8 July

9 July

15 July

18 July

19 July

21 July

August

4 August

18 August

23 August

24 August

September

4 September

9 September

11 September

12 September

13 September

16 September

17 September

21 September

23 September

24 September

26 September

October

1 October

2 October

3 October

4 October

8 October

10 October

13 October

15 October

16 October

17 October

18 October

19 October

22 October

23 October

27 October

30 October

Unknown date

November

1 November

6 November

7 November

10 November

12 November

16 November

21 November

24 November

December

4 December

6 December

8 December

9 December

10 December

12 December

13 December

18 December

22 December

25 December

29 December

30 December

Unknown date

See also
 Lists of shipwrecks

References

1961
 
Ships